Yury Toshev (24 December 1907 – 19 April 1974) was a Bulgarian chess master.

He thrice won the Bulgarian Chess Championship: 1933 (jointly with Georgy Geshev but lost a play-off match to him), 1942, and 1947 (jointly with Kamen Piskov).

He represented Bulgaria in the 3rd unofficial Chess Olympiad at Munich 1936. After World War II, he twice played for Bulgaria in Balkaniad team tournaments, and won bronze medals at Belgrade 1946 and Sofia 1947.

References

External links
Yury Toshev chess games  365Chess.com

1907 births
1974 deaths
Bulgarian chess players
20th-century chess players